Averlak is a municipality in the district of Dithmarschen, in Schleswig-Holstein, Germany. It is located on the Kiel Canal.

References

Dithmarschen